TGFA may refer to:
Tanzania Government Flight Agency, an executive agency of Tanzania that provides VIP flight service
TGF alpha, a human protein